Andrew Bowler is an American filmmaker. On January 24, 2012, he was nominated for an Academy Award for the short film Time Freak. In 2018, he made it a feature-length film. Bowler graduated from the Tisch School of the Arts of New York University in 1996.

Filmography

References

External links

Living people
American filmmakers
Tisch School of the Arts alumni
Place of birth missing (living people)
Year of birth missing (living people)